Timothy Maurice Tremlett (born 26 July 1956) is a former English cricketer and current director of cricket of Hampshire County Cricket Club. He is the father of England Test cricketer Chris Tremlett who also played for Hampshire and later, Surrey. Tremlett was an all-rounder, a right-handed batsman and right-arm medium pace bowler, who had a first-class bowling average of 23.99 and a one-day average of 24.69. He played from 1976 until 1991, and helped Hampshire win the Sunday League title in 1978 and 1986.

Tremlett was part of an England 'B' tour to Sri Lanka in 1985-6, and an "English Counties XI" tour of Zimbabwe in 1984-5, both captained by his county captain Mark Nicholas.

Tremlett's father, Maurice Tremlett, played county cricket for Somerset County Cricket Club and appeared in three Test matches for England.

References

1956 births
Living people
English cricketers
Hampshire cricketers
English cricket coaches
Marylebone Cricket Club cricketers
People from Wellington, Somerset